Music Hall Evangelical Lutheran Church is a historic church in Gilbert, South Carolina. It was founded in the belief that music should play a large role in the service. The congregation disbanded in 1906, and the building was used for storage.

It was built in 1892 and added to the National Register in 1983.

References

Lutheran churches in South Carolina
Churches on the National Register of Historic Places in South Carolina
Buildings and structures in Lexington County, South Carolina
National Register of Historic Places in Lexington County, South Carolina